The Okha–Beyt Dwarka Signature Bridge is an under construction cable-stayed sea bridge in India, connecting the Beyt Dwarka island in the Gulf of Kutch and Okha.

History
Approval for the construction of the bridge was given by Union Transport Minister Nitin Gadkari in 2016. Prime Minister Narendra Modi laid the foundation stone of the bridge between Okha and Beyt Dwarka on 7 October 2017.

The bridge will serve about 8500 people living on the island as well as about two million pilgrims visiting the temples there.

Architectural features 
Okha–Beyt Dwarka Signature Bridge is a cable-stayed bridge, with cables in a fan arrangement, built using steel pylons. The deck is made of composite steel-reinforced concrete with two carriageways. The solar panels atop footpath shade have capacity of 1 MW.

It has three spans with 500 metre-long middle span, the largest in India. The other 13 spans on either sides have length of 50 metre each. The approaches on Okha and Beyt Dwarka sides have length of 209 metre and 1101 metre respectively. Two A-shaped composite pylons supporting the bridge are 129.985 metre tall.

See also
Sudama Setu
List of longest bridges in the world
List of longest bridges above water in India

References

Dwarka
Bridges in Gujarat
Cable-stayed bridges in India
Road bridges in India
Cross-sea bridges in Asia